José Alexandre Alves Lindo (born August 15, 1973) is a former Brazilian football player.

Career
Alexandre played as an offensive midfielder for Mexican Primera División side Club Necaxa from 2004 to 2005.

Club statistics

References

External links

kyotosangadc

1973 births
Living people
Brazilian footballers
Brazilian expatriate footballers
J1 League players
Liga MX players
Kyoto Sanga FC players
São Paulo FC players
Santos FC players
Clube Atlético Mineiro players
Club Necaxa footballers
União São João Esporte Clube players
Coritiba Foot Ball Club players
Botafogo de Futebol e Regatas players
Clube do Remo players
Sertãozinho Futebol Clube players
Associação Portuguesa de Desportos players
Esporte Clube Juventude players
Expatriate footballers in Japan
Expatriate footballers in Mexico

Association football midfielders